Registered Offender is the debut comedy album by actor and stand-up comedian Rob Schneider.  Released in July 2010 by Oglio Records, it contains a mixture of sketches and songs, with all voices performed by Schneider.  The content is adult in nature and features various scatological references.  The album was recorded at various times and locations during 2007–2009.  A 7" vinyl single of the musical track "She's Gonna Come" b/w "Swain the Legend" was released simultaneously with the CD version of the album.

Background

"She's Gonna Come" features Schneider backed by a studio ensemble dubbed the Fabulous Dunderheads - which consists of members of the San Diego, CA-based alternative rock band The Night Marchers, led by former Rocket from the Crypt singer/guitarist John Reis.

Track listing
What I Want
Iraq Love
Yoko and Julian
She's Gonna Come
Swain the Legend
Virtual Kidnappers
Car Wash
The Perfect S--t
Agent for Porn Stars
Sex Offenders
The Liar Corp.
Welcome to the Jungle
Sea of J--z
Mom and Dad Party
Graduation Speech
Hidden Bonus Track

References

External links 
 
 

2010 debut albums
Rob Schneider albums
Oglio Records albums
2010s comedy albums
2010s spoken word albums
Spoken word albums by American artists